The Klamath Basin is the region in the U.S. states of Oregon and California drained by the Klamath River. It contains most of Klamath County and parts of Lake and Jackson counties in Oregon, and parts of Del Norte, Humboldt, Modoc, Siskiyou, and Trinity counties in California. The  drainage basin is 35% in Oregon and 65% in California. In Oregon, the watershed typically lies east of the Cascade Range, while California contains most of the river's segment that passes through the mountains. In the Oregon-far northern California segment of the river, the watershed is semi-desert at lower elevations and dry alpine in the upper elevations. In the western part of the basin, in California, however, the climate is more of temperate rainforest, and the Trinity River watershed consists of a more typical alpine climate.

Geology and hydrology
The Upper Klamath Watershed lies between the Cascade Range and the Basin and Range Province in southern Oregon and northern California. Bedrock stratigraphy in the area includes volcanic deposits, volcanic ejecta, and fluviolacustrine deposits. This creates three general hydrologic layers: 1) Highly permeable basalt with an older depositional age serving as the principle aquifer, 2) fluvial deposits made up of tuff, shale, agglomerate, sandstone, and volcanic ash that are collectively known as the Yonna Formation and act as a groundwater cap, and 3) more recent eruptive volcanic deposits that overlie the aquifer. Little water is able to permeate through the upper volcanic deposit layers to the principle aquifers. Groundwater is able to move freely throughout the upper basin despite geologic structures that occur due to normal faulting which only confine groundwater on a local scale. Artesian wells discharging into the Upper Klamath Lake are essential for recharge into the lake and Klamath River flow throughout the year. Snowmelt is currently a large contributor of groundwater recharge in the Upper Klamath Basin.

Distribution of subwatersheds

The drainage basins of the Williamson and Sprague Rivers, in Oregon, are to the north and northeast of Upper Klamath Lake. Together, the two watersheds cover , or 19.4% of the Klamath River watershed. The basin of the Lost River, the largest subwatershed by area, lies to the southeast of Upper Klamath Lake and to the east of Lower Klamath Lake. These account for 4.3%, 5%, 5.2%. and 5% of the Klamath River watershed, respectively, or 19.5% of the watershed if put together.

Further southwest, the watershed of the Trinity River, the second largest subwatershed of the Klamath, has  or 19% of the watershed. The watershed of the South Fork Trinity River is  - 33% of the Trinity watershed or 6% of the Klamath watershed. The primary tributaries of the Klamath together account for 77% of the total Klamath watershed - the remaining land area is drained by smaller tributaries such as Jenny Creek, Fall Creek and Blue Creek.

Major bodies of water

It is also the largest freshwater lake in the state of Oregon. Historically, Lower Klamath Lake and Tule Lake were one interconnected freshwater marsh that totaled  - more than twice the present-day dimensions of Upper Klamath Lake, and larger than Lake Tahoe in central California. This interconnected wetland still supports up to 3.7 million migrating birds per year. In wet years, the two lakes would connect to Upper Klamath Lake, forming one huge body of water. These lakes occupy the basin that was prehistorically occupied by Lake Modoc, a  freshwater lake that covered the entire Upper Klamath Basin, or 7% of the watershed - an area three times larger than the massive Salton Sea in southern California. This lake existed up to 11,000 years ago at the end of the most recent ice age. Today, Upper Klamath Lake encompasses just 0.6% of the Klamath watershed.

There are also several artificial bodies of water in the watershed - including Lake Ewauna, J.C. Boyle Reservoir, Copco Lake, and Iron Gate Reservoir on the main Klamath. Together, the four lower mainstem reservoirs total just , or 0.04% of the Klamath River watershed.

Trinity Lake, on the mainstem of the Trinity River, is the largest tributary reservoir in the Klamath River watershed. At  in size, it is larger than all four mainstem Klamath reservoirs combined (excluding Upper Klamath Lake).

Watershed
According to the USGS watershed classification system, the Klamath Watershed is a 6-digit, level 3 Accounting Unit within Region 18, known as the California watershed region. The accounting unit of the Klamath Watershed is 180102 and includes twelve 8-digit Hydrologic Units (HUCs) covering 9.4 million acres. In the 2000 census, about 114,000 people were estimated to be living within the Klamath Watershed. The largest population centers include Klamath Falls, Oregon (19,462) and Yreka, California (7,290). Land ownership within the basin breaks down into the following: about 90,000 acres are controlled by tribal reservations, 6.2 million acres are managed by public agencies (including the Bureau of Land Management, National Forests, National Wildlife Refuges, and National Park Service), and 3.7 million is privately owned. Of the privately owned land, 557,000 acres are used for farming 80% of which is irrigated farmland. Nearly half of irrigated land utilizes water from the Bureau of Land Management’s Klamath Project. The vast majority of privately owned agriculture and rangeland occurs in the Lost River and Shasta River sub-basins. 

The Klamath Basin watershed includes:

These three rivers are located above (north) of the Klamath Lake basin:
 Sprague River, Oregon
 Williamson River, Oregon
 Sycan River, Oregon
These features are inside or near the Klamath Lake basin:
 Upper Klamath Lake, Oregon
 Link River, Oregon
 Agency Lake, Oregon
 Lost River, Oregon, California
 Clear Lake Reservoir, California
 Tule Lake, California
 Lower Klamath Lake, California
These are the major downstream tributaries of the Klamath River:
 Butte Creek, California, Oregon
 Shasta River, California
 Scott River, California
 Salmon River, California
 Trinity River, California

Communities
Communities in the Klamath Basin include:

See also

References

External links
Klamath Waters Digital Library from Oregon Institute of Technology
Map of Klamath Basin from The Wilderness Society

Klamath River Restoration
Congressional hearings
The Klamath River Basin: Hearing before the Committee on Energy and Natural Resources, United States Senate, One Hundred Thirteenth Congress, First Session ... June 20, 2013
Klamath Basin: Hearing before the Subcommittee on Water and Power of the Committee on Energy and Natural Resources, United States Senate, One Hundred Thirteenth Congress, Second Session, to Hear Testimony on S. 2379, the "Klamath Basin Water Recovery and Economic Restoration Act of 2014," June 3, 2014

Klamath River
Watersheds of California
Watersheds of the United States
Regions of California
Regions of Oregon
Landforms of Del Norte County, California
Landforms of Humboldt County, California
Landforms of Modoc County, California
Landforms of Siskiyou County, California
Landforms of Trinity County, California
Landforms of Klamath County, Oregon
Landforms of Jackson County, Oregon
Landforms of Lake County, Oregon
Northern California
Klamath Mountains
Rogue River-Siskiyou National Forest
Valleys of Oregon